The 20th District of the Iowa House of Representatives in the state of Iowa.

Current elected officials
Ray Sorensen is the representative currently representing the district.

Past representatives
The district has previously been represented by:
 John W. Patten, 1971–1973
 Robert M. Carr, 1973–1975
 Tom Tauke, 1975–1979
 Mike Connolly, 1979–1983
 John D. Groninga, 1983–1993
 Dennis J. May, 1993–2003
 Willard Jenkins, 2003–2007
 Doris Kelley, 2007–2011
 Walt Rogers, 2011–2013
 Clel Baudler, 2013–2019
 Ray Sorensen, 2019–present

References

020